Firstview is an unincorporated community in Cheyenne County, Colorado. It is on U.S. Highway 40; the nearest city is Cheyenne Wells. The geographic coordinates of Firstview are roughly the antipodes of the coordinates of Île Saint-Paul, a French island in the Indian Ocean. This island is one of only three land areas with antipodes in the contiguous United States.

The town was laid out in 1911. It was named for the spot where travelers got their first glimpse of Pikes Peak,  to the west.

References

Unincorporated communities in Cheyenne County, Colorado
Unincorporated communities in Colorado